Thylacella is a genus of scaly-winged barklice in the family Lepidopsocidae. There are at least 20 described species in Thylacella.

Species
These 20 species belong to the genus Thylacella:

 Thylacella acutipennis Badonnel, 1967
 Thylacella angulifrons Badonnel, 1967
 Thylacella angustipennis Broadhead & Richards, 1982
 Thylacella annulata Badonnel, 1976
 Thylacella brasiliensis Mockford, 2005
 Thylacella congolensis (Badonnel, 1949)
 Thylacella cubana (Banks, 1941)
 Thylacella fasciata Badonnel, 1955
 Thylacella fasciifrons Badonnel, 1967
 Thylacella fenestrata Smithers, 1964
 Thylacella huautlensis Garcia Aldrete, 2001
 Thylacella immaculata Badonnel, 1955
 Thylacella madagascariensis Smithers, 1964
 Thylacella montana Badonnel, 1967
 Thylacella pilipennis (Enderlein, 1912)
 Thylacella similis Badonnel, 1967
 Thylacella trifurcata Badonnel, 1976
 Thylacella vitripennis Badonnel, 1967
 † Thylacella eocenica Nel, Prokop, De Ploeg & Millet, 2005 Oise amber, France, Ypresian
 † Thylacella eversiana Enderlein, 1911 Holocene copal, Tanzania

References

Trogiomorpha
Articles created by Qbugbot